Střelské Hoštice is a municipality and village in Strakonice District in the South Bohemian Region of the Czech Republic. It has about 900 inhabitants.

Administrative parts
Villages of Kozlov, Sedlo and Střelskohoštická Lhota are administrative parts of Střelské Hoštice.

References

Villages in Strakonice District